Nicolum River Provincial Park, formerly Nicolum Provincial Park, is a provincial park in British Columbia, Canada, located at the confluence of the Nicolum and Coquihalla Rivers near the town of Hope. The park is a Class A, category 6 Provincial Park.

History
Prior to the establishment of the park, it was explored in 1846 by Alexander Caulfield Anderson of the Hudson's Bay Company. Later on, the Dewdney Trail passed just beyond the current boundary of the park. The 24-hectare Nicolum River Provincial Park was established on March 16, 1956 as a rest stop along the recently opened Highway 3, and was developed into a campground with 9 campsites. Vehicular access to the provincial park and campground was ended in the 2000s. The park is still open to the public, but camping is forbidden. The day use parking lot has been closed.

Facilities
BC Parks no longer maintains Nicolum River Provincial Park, and therefore no facilities are open for public use at the park. All washrooms are closed and removed. Parking is available outside the main gate along Highway 3.

References

Lower Mainland
Provincial parks of British Columbia
Canadian Cascades
1956 establishments in British Columbia
Protected areas established in 1956